The following is a list of public housing estates in Tsuen Wan, Hong Kong, including Home Ownership Scheme (HOS), Private Sector Participation Scheme (PSPS), Sandwich Class Housing Scheme (SCHS), Flat-for-Sale Scheme (FFSS), and Tenants Purchase Scheme (TPS) estates.

Overview

Cheung Shan Estate

Cheung Shan Estate is located between Shek Wai Kok Estate and Lei Muk Shue Estate, and near Shing Mun Tunnels. Formerly the site of Cheung Pei Shan Temporary Housing Area, it consists of 3 residential buildings and a shopping centre completed in 1978.

Fuk Loi Estate

Fuk Loi Estate is located at the reclaimed land along Castle Peak Road and opposite to Nan Fung Centre, Tsuen Kam Centre and Discovery Park. It has 9 residential buildings completed between 1963 and 1967, and it is the oldest existing public housing estate in Tsuen Wan District and Kwai Tsing District.

The original Tsuen Wan Public Library occupied the ground floor of Wing Hong House. It was the first public library in the New Territories.

Lei Muk Shue Estate

Lei Muk Shue Estate is the largest public housing estate in Tsuen Wan District consisting of 17 buildings, with the maximum population of 37,000. It was built in the 1970s. Although it is geographically located in the eastern part of Tsuen Wan as well as the northern part of Kwai Chung, it administratively belongs to Tsuen Wan District instead of Kwai Tsing District because it is at the west of Wo Yi Hop Road, the boundary between the two districts.

Shek Wai Kok Estate

Shek Wai Kok Estate is located in Shek Wai Kok, near Shing Mun Valley and Luk Yeung Sun Chuen. It consists of 8 residential buildings completed in 1980.

Sheung Chui Court

Bo Shek Mansion

Bo Shek Mansion is a Flat-for-Sale Scheme estate located at the reclaimed land in Sha Tsui Road. It now consists of 3 residential buildings, built in 1996 by Hong Kong Housing Society. It, in total, offers 268 units for rental use and 400 units for the Flat-for-Sale Scheme.

The estate was built in 1964 with in total 3 blocks. Its name in Chinese, literally "Precious Stones Estate" in English, was derived from the nearby Shek Pik San Tsuen (the character 石 means "stone"). The original estate was demolished in 1992, and 3 buildings, which stand today, were rebuilt at the site in 1996. 

Prior to the redevelopment in 1996, the English name for the estate was "Bo Shek Dai Ha", completely transliterated from the Chinese pronunciation. However, it was renamed Bo Shek Mansion afterwards.

Clague Garden Estate

Clague Garden Estate is a Flat-for-Sale Scheme and public housing estate by Hong Kong Housing Society located on reclaimed land near Tsuen Wan Ferry Pier and MTR Tsuen Wan West station.

It consists of three residential buildings, built in 1989 by the Hong Kong Housing Society. It offers 552 flats for rent and 926 under the Flat-for-Sale Scheme. Many early residents were resettled from the Four Seasons Estate, a nearby public housing estate that was demolished in 1990.

The estate was named for Sir Douglas Clague, the ex-chairman of Hong Kong Housing Society and the former head of Hutchison International. It received a Certificate of Merit at the 1991 Hong Kong Institute of Architects Annual Awards.

Moon Lok Dai Ha

Moon Lok Dai Ha is located at the reclaimed land between Sha Tsui Road and Hoi Pa Street and near Fuk Loi Estate. It comprises 4 blocks of 11-storey buildings built in 1964 and 1965 by Hong Kong Housing Society, offering a total of 968 units. Its name, "Moon Lok Dai Ha", means "a building filled with happiness" in Chinese language. Rehabilitation works in the estate started in 2004 and finished in 2006.

References

Tsuen Wan